Scott Miller (born 27 September 1981) is an Australian soccer coach, currently serving as head coach of National Premier Leagues Victoria 2 club Langwarrin SC. He has previously served as the head coach of A-League club Newcastle Jets and has performed assistant coaching roles at Fulham, the Australian national team and Aalborg BK.

Playing career
Miller played for Gippsland Falcons, Essendon and Fitzroy, before his career was cut short by injuries in his early 20s.

Writing in the Australian Times in 2013, Miller spoke of his playing career, "Having played football in Australia, I wanted to work at the highest level in football, which for me has always been the Premier League."

Coaching career
In 2006, Miller moved to England to further his coaching ambitions, joining Fulham as a fitness coach in 2007. He later appointed assistant technical coach, before going on to serve as the coach of Fulham's U-21 team.

When Ange Postecoglou was appointed head coach of Australia in late 2013, he took on a short-term role as an assistant coach.

After nine seasons with Fulham, in June 2015, Miller was released by the club to pursue other opportunities.

Soon after leaving Fulham, he was linked to the Newcastle Jets head coach role. It was confirmed that he had penned a two-year deal with the club on 18 June. The appointment of Miller made him the youngest head coach in the decade-long history of the A-League at just 33 years of age. Miller was released from his position as head coach before the start of the 2016–17 A-League season.

On 30 November 2016 Miller returned to Europe and joined Danish club Aalborg BK as an assistant coach, on a two-year contract.

In October 2018 Miller joined the Fox Sports Hyundai A League team as a football analyst.

In August 2018, it was announced that Miller would be the head coach of NPL Victoria 2 club Langwarrin SC for the 2019 season.

Personal life 
Miller grew up on the Mornington Peninsula.

Miller possesses an AFC Pro Diploma, UEFA A-Licence, and also holds university degrees in sports science and psychology.

In 2017, Miller created Identity Pro to support emerging players and coaches with the knowledge and experience he gained at the elite level during his 10 years in Europe.

Coaching record

References

1981 births
Living people
A-League Men managers
Australian expatriate soccer coaches
Australian expatriate sportspeople in Denmark
Australian expatriate sportspeople in England
Australian soccer coaches
Fulham F.C. non-playing staff
Newcastle Jets FC managers
Soccer players from Melbourne
Association footballers not categorized by position
Association football players not categorized by nationality
People from Mornington Peninsula